Domingo Santa Cruz Wilson (July 5, 1899 – 1987) was a Chilean composer, music educator and lawyer. He won the National Prize of Art of Chile in 1951.

References

1899 births
1987 deaths
People from Quillota Province
University of Chile alumni
20th-century Chilean lawyers
Chilean composers